Maxime is a French given name that may refer to:

As a name
Maxime Bernier (born 1963), former Canadian Minister of Foreign Affairs
Maxime Bôcher, American mathematician
Maxime Boyer, Canadian professional wrestler
Maxime Du Camp, French writer and photographer
Maxime Chaya, Lebanese explorer
Maxime Cressy, American tennis player
Maxime Dupé, French footballer
Maxime Faget, an inventor
Maxime Le Forestier, French singer
Maxime Médard, French Rugby Union player
Maxime Minot (born 1987), French politician
Maxime Monfort, Belgian racing cyclist
Maxime Partouche, French footballer, who currently plays for Paris Saint-Germain FC
Maxime Rodinson, French Marxist historian, sociologist and orientalist
Maxime Rodriguez, French composer
Maxime Talbot, Canadian former ice hockey player
Maxime Vachier-Lagrave, French chess Grandmaster
Maxime Verhagen, former Dutch Minister of Foreign Affairs
Maxime Weygand, French military commander from World War I and World War II

In fiction
Olympe Maxime, French and is the headmistress of Beauxbatons in the fictional world of Harry Potter.
 Maxime (film), a 1958 French film

Origins
Maxime was originally the Latin translation for "Maximus", "the greatest".

See also
Maxim (given name), a male first name of Roman origin and is relatively common in Slavic-speaking countries.
Maxim (disambiguation)

French masculine given names

Surnames
Given names

de:Maxime (Vorname)